The EuroLeague American Tour was a series of games organized in 2009, 2010 and 2012. Its purpose is for EuroLeague and sometimes 2nd-tier level EuroCup teams to play against National Basketball Association teams. The games of the EuroLeague American Tour are played by NBA rules.

The EuroLeague American Tour continues a tradition of friendly competition between NBA and EuroLeague teams that dates back to 1978, when Maccabi Tel Aviv played the Washington Bullets in Tel Aviv, Israel. Combined with the NBA Global Games, that also regularly present clashes between EuroLeague and NBA squads.

Seasons
 2009 EuroLeague American Tour
 2010 EuroLeague American Tour
 2012 EuroLeague American Tour

History
The first event that took place in 2009 involved Olympiacos, Maccabi Tel Aviv and Partizan Belgrade from the EuroLeague. They played against the San Antonio Spurs, the Cleveland Cavaliers, the Denver Nuggets and the Phoenix Suns, losing all four games.

The second event in 2010 involved CSKA Moscow and Caja Laboral against the Memphis Grizzlies, the Miami Heat, the Oklahoma City Thunder, the Cleveland Cavaliers and the San Antonio Spurs.

The third edition of the EuroLeague American Tour took place in 2012, involving Real Madrid and Mens Sana Siena against the Memphis Grizzlies, the Toronto Raptors, the Cleveland Cavaliers and the San Antonio Spurs.

In 2013, CSKA Moscow traveled to the United States to play against the Minnesota Timberwolves and the San Antonio Spurs. In 2014, Maccabi Tel Aviv played in the USA against the Cleveland Cavaliers and the Brooklyn Nets.
In 2015, Maccabi Tel Aviv played against Olimpia Milano in New York City and Chicago. That was the first time two European teams met to play against each other in the United States.

Participations

See also
 NBA Global Games
 NBA Canada Series
 List of games played between NBA and international teams
 NBA versus EuroLeague games
 McDonald's Championship
 Naismith Cup

References

External links
 

 
EuroLeague
Recurring sporting events established in 2009
Basketball competitions in North America
NBA vs FIBA